Kamienica is a settlement in Gmina Paszowice, Jawor County, Lower Silesian Voivodeship, in south-western Poland.

From 1975 to 1998 the village was in Legnica Voivodeship.

References
TERYT 

Kamienica